Shakur Kandi (also Romanized as Shakūr Kandī) is a village in Marhemetabad-e Jonubi Rural District, in the Central District of Miandoab County, West Azerbaijan Province, Iran. At the 2006 census, its population was 475, in 98 families.

References 

Populated places in Miandoab County